Harditerha is a village in West Champaran district in the Indian state of Bihar.

Demographics
As of 2011 India census, Harditerha had a population of 3821 in 739 households. Males constitute 51.76% of the population and females 48.23%. Harditerha has an average literacy rate of 45.82%, lower than the national average of 74%: male literacy is 62.42%, and female literacy is 37.57%. In Harditerha, 21.35% of the population is under 6 years of age.

References

Villages in West Champaran district